Annika Schmarsel (born 8 July 1993) known by her stage name Alice Ivy,  is an Australian electronic musician and producer. Alice Ivy was the winner of the 2016 Triple J Unearthed Listen Out competition. She has released two studio albums: I'm Dreaming (2018), and Don't Sleep (2020),  which reached No. 77 on the ARIA Albums Chart.

Early life
Annika Schmarsel was born in 1993 to West German immigrants who settled in Geelong in 1987. Annika also has a younger brother. At the age of twelve, on a family trip to Germany, Schmarsel's grandmother taught her guitar chords while her uncle taught her how to play "Smoke on the Water" by Deep Purple. During high school a year later, she was a member of a 25-member soul big band and on-going music project, The Sweethearts. In 2014, Schmarsel moved to Melbourne to study for a music industry degree at RMIT University, and was introduced to the music software Ableton. She learnt about influential electronic producers including the late J Dilla.

Music career

2015–2018: Early years and I'm Dreaming
On 3 January 2015, Annika Schmarsel under the alias 'Alice Ivy', released her debut single "Charlie". On 14 April, she released her next single "Mean Man's Bite" featuring guest vocals from Chloe Beckwith. On 26 June, Alice Ivy released her single "Paint Me Blue" again featuring vocals by Chloe Beckwith. On 13 November, Alice Ivy released the single "Walk On" featuring Indigo Fly.

On 25 January 2016, Alice Ivy released her single "Touch" featuring guest vocals by Georgia van Etten, a music video was released on 8 February animated by James Thompson and Bill Presser. On 23 June, she released "Almost Here" featuring vocals by RaRa. The two singles quickly became her most popular, having collectively amassed over 3,000,000 streams on Spotify. Alice Ivy then performed a five-date tour to promote the two singles in July. On 2 September, Alice Ivy remixed "Float" by Thomston.

In March 2017, she released her single "Get Me a Drink" featuring E^ST and Charlie Threads, it became her first track to be added to high rotation on Triple J. The Age placed the track at #8 in their "Best Songs Of 2017". On 21 April, she remixed "Beat the Keeper" by Taj Ralph. On 26 May, Alice Ivy remixed "Kate's Bed" by Huntly. In September, after signing a deal with Australian record label Dew Process she released "Be Friends" featuring guest vocals from Tim de Cotta and Caseaux O.S.L.O. On 22 September, Alice Ivy released a remix of "West" by Lakyn. On 10 November, Alice Ivy remixed the track "Life Goes On" by E^ST. On 12 December, a music video was released for her track "Be Friends".

On 12 January 2018, she released the single "Chasing Stars" featuring ARIA award winning singer-songwriter, Bertie Blackman. Both "Be Friends", and "Chasing Stars" were also added to high rotation as well. Later that month, Alice Ivy signed onto Last Gang Records for international releases. In the middle of that year, "Chasing Stars" became the eleventh most played track on Triple J. On 9 February, her debut album I'm Dreaming was released. It contained most her previously released singles including "Charlie". To promote her debut album, Ivy performed an eight-date national headlining tour ranging from 16 February until 29 March and performing in Sydney, Brisbane, Melbourne, Adelaide, Perth, Panama Festival in Tasmania, The Hills are Alive in Victoria, and Bendigo. On 30 March, Alice Ivy covered Estelle's track "American Boy" with E^ST and Miss Blanks for Triple J's Like a Version. On 6 April, Ivy remixed the track "Panopticon" by Cloud Control. On 13 April, Alice Ivy along with other remixers TOKiMONSTA, Maria Marcus, and Maya Jane Coles, all made their own remixes of "Lady Powers" by Vera Blue featuring Kodi Shane, released on Lady Powers | Power Ladies Remix EP. On 8 August, she released a remix of "Clothes I Slept In" by Luca Brasi. On 7 September, Alice Ivy remixed the track "Real Love" by Flint Eastwood.

2019–2020: Don't Sleep
On 9 February 2019, rain damaged Alice Ivy's equipment and she was unable to play at the Tasmanian music festival Party In The Paddock the day after as planned. The rain damaged her laptop, guitar pedals and drum pad. Ivy stated she would play in Tasmania again as soon as she was able to. On 15 February, Alice Ivy released a remix of Amwin's track "DeLorean". On 22 February, Alice Ivy released a new single entitled "Close to You" featuring Flint Eastwood. She also announced a "Close to You" tour starting in May with Miss Blanks, who previously collaborated with Alice Ivy for Triple J's Like a Version. The tour is slated to start in Adelaide, and then go on to Wollongong, Canberra, Sydney, Melbourne, Hobart, Fremantle, Brisbane and the Gold Coast. On 22 March, a remix of "Fooling Around" by Japanese Wallpaper was released. On 30 April, a music video for "Close to You" was released. The video featured Ivy's dog "Lexie". On 10 July, Ivy released the single "In My Mind" featuring Ecca Vandal alongside an accompanying music video. On 6 November, Alice Ivy released the single "Sunrise" featuring Cadence Weapon alongside an accompanying music video.

On 1 April 2020, Alice Ivy released "Don't Sleep" the titular single of her upcoming second studio album Don't Sleep, set to release on 17 July. The single featured Imbi the Girl and Boi. She also released an accompanying music video for the single. On 27 May, Alice Ivy released the fourth single from her then-forthcoming album titled "Better Man" featuring Safia frontman Benjamin Joseph. A music video was released alongside starring comedian and radio personality Alex Dyson. Her sophomore studio album was officially released on 18 July. The twelve-track album contained her four previously released singles, and seven other tracks featuring guest vocals. The track "Ticket to Heaven" featured Thelma Plum, "I'll Find It" featured Odette, "Sweetest Love" featured Montaigne and Bertie Blackman, "All Hit Radio" featured Teef and Tessa (vocalist for the band Tessa & the Typecast), "Money" featured DijahSB, "All In For You" featured Ngaiire, and "Gold" also featured Bertie Blackman. Don't Sleep peaked at number 77 on the ARIA charts.

2021–present: New singles
On 28 July 2021, Alice Ivy was featured on "Someone Stranger" by Georgia Maq the singer, songwriter and guitarist for Camp Cope. Alice Ivy begun teasing a new single from 8 October, collaborating with Brisbane-based pop artist Sycco and American bassist Nick Movshon. Their single "Weakness" was released on 22 October with an accompanying music video directed by Dom Gould. The single and music video were recorded separately in Brisbane and Melbourne due to COVID-19 lock-down restrictions. Airlock Studios in Brisbane, and XO Studios in Melbourne.

Musical style
Alice Ivy lists her influences as Marvin Gaye, Diana Ross and Etta James. Other influences include The Avalanches, J Dilla, Onra, Anderson Paak, Mark Ronson. Her sound has also been likened to Gramatik, L'Orange and Curtis Mayfield. She says that soul and Motown music inspired her to explore music production, and these influences particularly shine through on her 2020 single "Weakness."

Discography

Studio albums

Notes

Singles

As lead artist

As featured artist

Remixes

Notes

Videography

Music videos

Awards and nominations

AIR Awards
The Australian Independent Record Awards (commonly known informally as AIR Awards) is an annual awards night to recognise, promote and celebrate the success of Australia's Independent Music sector.

! 
|-
| 2022
| "Weakness" (with Sycco)
| Best Independent Dance, Electronica or Club Single
| 
|

ARIA Music Awards
The ARIA Music Awards is an annual awards ceremony that recognises excellence, innovation, and achievement across all genres of Australian music. Ivy has received 2 nominations.

|-
|rowspan="2"| 2020  
| Don't Sleep 
| ARIA Award for Best Dance Release 
| 
|-
| Alice Ivy for Don't Sleep 
| ARIA Award for Engineer of the Year
| 
|-

Australian Music Prize
The Australian Music Prize (the AMP) is an annual award of $30,000 given to an Australian band or solo artist in recognition of the merit of an album released during the year of award. They commenced in 2005.

|-
| Australian Music Prize 2020
| Don't Sleep
| Album of the Year
| 
|}

Australian Women in Music Awards
The Australian Women in Music Awards is an annual event that celebrates outstanding women in the Australian Music Industry who have made significant and lasting contributions in their chosen field. They commenced in 2018.

|-
|rowspan="2"| 2021
| Alice Ivy
| Diversity in Music Award
| 
|-
| Alice Ivy
| Studio Production Award
|

J Awards
The J Awards are an annual series of Australian music awards that were established by the Australian Broadcasting Corporation's youth-focused radio station Triple J. They commenced in 2005.

! 
|-
! scope="row"| 2020
| Don't Sleep
| Australian Album of the Year
| 
| 
|}

Music Victoria Awards
The Music Victoria Awards, are an annual awards night celebrating Victorian music. They commenced in 2005.

! 
|-
| 2016
| Alice Ivy
| Best Emerging Artist
| 
|rowspan="3"| 
|-
| 2018
| Alice Ivy
| Best Electronic Act 
| 
|-
| 2020
| Alice Ivy
| Best Producer 
| 
|-
|rowspan="4"| 2021
|rowspan="3"| Alice Ivy
| Best Producer
| 
|
|-
| Best Solo Artist
| 
|rowspan="3"|] 
|-
| Best Pop Act
| 
|-
| Don't Sleep
| Best Victorian Album
| 
|-
| 2022
| Alice Ivy
| Best Producer
| 
| 
|-

National Live Music Awards
The National Live Music Awards (NLMAs) are a broad recognition of Australia's diverse live industry, celebrating the success of the Australian live scene. The awards commenced in 2016.

|-
| National Live Music Awards of 2018
| Alice Ivy
| Live Electronic Act (or DJ) of the Year
| 
|-
| National Live Music Awards of 2020
| Alice Ivy
| Victorian Live Act of the Year
| 
|-

References

1993 births
Living people
Australian people of German descent
Australian musicians
Dew Process artists
Australian electronic musicians
Musicians from Geelong
21st-century Australian musicians
Australian record producers
Remixers
Musicians from Victoria (Australia)
Australian women in electronic music